Aleksei Vladimirovich Kozlov (born 18 August 1975) is a former Russian footballer. He is the son of Vladimir Kozlov.

References

1975 births
Footballers from Moscow
Living people
Russian footballers
Association football defenders
FC Dynamo Moscow players
Russian Premier League players
FC Elista players
FC Tom Tomsk players
FC Anzhi Makhachkala players
FC Khimki players
FC Salyut Belgorod players
FC Sodovik Sterlitamak players
FC MVD Rossii Moscow players